GBR-13098 is a psychostimulant and selective dopamine uptake inhibitor.

Blocking the endogenous striatal dopamine (DA) transporter with GBR-13098 in mice has been shown to prevent damage to the DA nerve terminals caused by malonate. It was suggested that DA transporter inhibitors like GBR-13098 could be used to prevent or treat neurodegenerative disorders caused by the effect of mitochondrial dysfunction on DA homeostasis.

See also
 Vanoxerine
 GBR-12783
 GBR-12935
 GBR-13069
 DBL-583

References

Stimulants
Dopamine reuptake inhibitors
1-(2-(Bis(4-fluorophenyl)methoxy)ethyl)piperazines